The chief merchandising officer (CMO) is a top-level executive employee who controls the merchandising in a company or other organization.

Responsibilities
A Chief Merchandising Officer has the responsibility of overseeing a company or other organization's buying and selling activities and utilizing the information gathered to develop a plan of action toward future purchase decisions. They often make these decisions on behalf of the company and steer the direction or vision of the company's merchandise strategy by analyzing trends and purchasing needs and fulfilling them when appropriate. They may also lead the merchandising sales floor in a retail environment. The Chief Merchandising Officer is generally placed in a position of authority over a group of merchandising,  purchasing, or floor display staff.

Notes and references